Cassian Haid, born Josef was the 75th General Abbot of the Common observance between 1920–1927.

He entered in 1897 in the Abbey of Mehrerau, of the Common Observance. He became in 1917 territorial abbot of the Territorial Abbey of Wettingen-Mehrerau he was in function between 1917–1949, after his resignation he was succeeded by dom Franciscus Janssens. In 1938 he fled from the Nazis into Zwitserland. He died as abbot in his abbey in 1949 and was succeeded by Heinrich Suso Groner.

References

Cistercian abbots general
1879 births
1949 deaths